Genevieve Rose Angelson is an American actress, best-known for playing Alanis Wheeler on The Handmaid’s Tale,  Indigo on The Afterparty, Patti Robinson on Good Girls Revolt, and Ruth on Flack.

Early life and education
Angelson was born in New York City to lawyer and businessman Mark Angelson and his wife, Lynn. Angelson has two elder sisters, Jessica and Meredith. She attended The Brearley School in Manhattan, and graduated Phi Beta Kappa from Wesleyan University and the Tisch School of the Arts's Graduate Acting Program.

Career
In September 2013, Angelson was added to the cast of the Showtime series House of Lies as Caitlin Hobart. In 2014, Angelson replaced Mamie Gummer to play the role of Det. Nicole Gravely in Backstrom for which Deadline Hollywood named Angelson one of the best casting discoveries of the year. In 2016, she starred in the Amazon Video original series, Good Girls Revolt; however, the series was cancelled by Amazon after one season. She co-starred in The Upside, the American remake of the French film The Intouchables. In 2019, Angelson was cast in Flack, starring alongside Anna Paquin, as well as the second season of the DC Comics show Titans. Variety named Angelson one of the Top Ten TV Stars to Watch. In December 2021, Angelson appeared back to back on primetime NBC in This is Us and New Amsterdam, on which shows she recurs.  She is a main cast member of The AfterParty on Apple TV+ created by Phil Lord and Chris Miller.

She originated the role of Nina in Vanya and Sonia and Masha and Spike, winner of the Tony Award for Best Play winner at the 67th Tony Awards, in which Ben Brantley called her "exquisite." She has appeared in multiple other plays off-Broadway, including The Cake by Bekah Brunstetter at Manhattan Theater Club.

She is a published writer, and a regular contributor to Town & Country, Elle, and Refinery29.

Filmography

References

External links
 
 
 

21st-century American actresses
American stage actresses
American film actresses
American television actresses
Living people
Tisch School of the Arts alumni
Actresses from New York (state)
Year of birth missing (living people)